Bausch + Lomb is an eye health products company based in Vaughan, Ontario, Canada. It is one of the world's largest suppliers of contact lenses, lens care products, pharmaceuticals, intraocular lenses, and other eye surgery products. The company was founded in Rochester, New York, in 1853 by optician John Bausch and cabinet maker turned financial backer Henry Lomb. Until its sale in 2013, Bausch + Lomb was one of the oldest continually operating companies in the United States.

Bausch + Lomb was a public company listed on the NYSE, until it was acquired by private equity firm Warburg Pincus in 2007. In May 2013, Canadian-based Valeant Pharmaceuticals announced that it would acquire Bausch + Lomb from Warburg Pincus for $4.5 billion in cash. The deal, which was approved by shareholders, closed on August 5, 2013. On May 6, 2022, the company completed an initial public offering and again became publicly traded.  Today, the company employs about 21,000 people and manufactures and markets health care products directly or indirectly in approximately 100 countries.

Company history

Early years

In 1853, John Bausch and Henry Lomb, both German immigrants, established a small but ambitious workshop producing monocles in Rochester, New York. By 1861, their operation had expanded to manufacturing vulcanite rubber eyeglass frames and other precision vision products.

Early growth of the company
During the American Civil War, the Union blockade caused the price of gold and European horn to rise dramatically. This resulted in a growing demand for the Bausch + Lomb spectacles made from vulcanite.

In 1876, Ernst Gundlach joined the company as it began to manufacture microscopes. Later that year, the Bausch & Lomb Optical Company won a distinction at the Philadelphia Centennial Exposition. The company also produced photographic lenses (1883), spectacle lenses (1889), microtomes (1890), binoculars and telescopes (1893). From 1892 in cooperation with Zeiss in Germany, the company produced optical lenses. In this manner, at the end of the 19th century, the product range included eyeglasses, microscopes and binoculars, as well as projectors, camera lenses and camera diaphragms.

Expansion of production at the beginning of the 20th century
With the growth of the US army, under President Theodore Roosevelt and the buildup of the naval fleet, Bausch & Lomb received the commission, through the supplier Saegmuller, to manufacture high-precision lenses for optical measurement and founded a joint venture with Saegmuller. At the same time as this new expansion, a research department with five members was started to develop new products and improve old ones. A new alliance with the Zeiss company in Germany ensured competitive advantages for the three participants, Bausch & Lomb, Saegmuller and Zeiss, in terms of patent use and opening new markets.  In 1902, William Bausch, the son of the founder, developed a process to create the desired lens shape directly by casting molten glass. Previously, the glass parts for the lenses had to be separated, ground and polished in a complicated process, and this brought significant savings in time and materials.

The company produced the first optical-quality glass in America during the early to mid-1900s. By the year 1903 the company began manufacturing microscopes, binoculars, and camera shutters.

The First and Second World Wars
The further development of the firm was affected by political events. Because of the World Wars and the consequent need for optical instruments such as field glasses, range finders, camera lenses, binocular telescopes, searchlight mirrors, torpedo tube sights, and periscopes, the product range could be considerably broadened. Until World War I, optical glass and the instruments made from it (including many military instruments) were often imported into most European and North American countries from Germany. The same was also true of chemical products and laboratory equipment. The outbreak of the war, with Germany's new enemy status, created a scramble to rapidly enhance the domestic industries. In 1933, Bausch + Lomb started to honor outstanding high school science students with the Bausch+Lomb Honorary Science Award. In the 1930s, military products represented 70% of total production. The Ray-Ban brand of sunglasses was developed for pilots in 1936.

After 1945
At a time when the cinema was being superseded by television, Bausch & Lomb developed improved optics for the CinemaScope process, which popularized the film-based anamorphic format and led most cinemas to double the widths of their screens.

In 1965 Bausch & Lomb acquired patent for hydrogel contact lenses created by Czech scientists Otto Wichterle and Drahoslav Lím. In 1971, after three years of development work, two years for the medical approval by the United States Food and Drug Administration and an investment of three million USD, Bausch + Lomb launched contact lenses made of Poly-HEMA. In contrast to the contact lenses previously available, made of glass and Lucite (acrylic glass), the new lenses were softer. They were marketed under the brand name "Soflens".

In the 1970s, the company was a major producer of spectrophotometers for the dye and chemical business, such as the Spectronic 20.

A massive restructuring of the company began in the mid-1980s. What had been the core divisions, the production of lenses for various purposes, were sold off. The sunglasses division was continued as Ray-Ban and kept selling well due to effective product placement. By the planned acquisition of other firms, such as Polymer Technology Corporation and Dr. Mann Pharma, existing business areas such as contact lens production were strengthened and new ones were initiated.

In 1997, as a result of a series of company acquisitions, the division for the manufacture of surgical products was established. The Ray-Ban brand was sold in 1999 to the Italian Luxottica Group.

Company developments in recent years
Since then, Bausch & Lomb has developed into a globally operating company which is one of the largest producers of contact lenses. Today, about 13,000 employees in 36 countries work for the firm. Total turnover for the year 2006 was estimated at US$2.29 billion.

Competitors in the international eye care products market are Johnson & Johnson, Allergan, Alcon and Ciba Vision (Novartis), MSD-Chibret and CooperVision.

Business areas

Business areas are divided into three large divisions:
 Vision Care: contact lenses and eye-care products.
 Pharmaceuticals: medicines for various eye diseases and irritations.
 Surgery: aids and implants.

In the last few years, several business areas in the Vision Care division have been developed in the framework of product diversification. The manufacturing of contact lenses still accounted for 28% of Bausch & Lomb's turnover in 2001, making it its main business activity. The "SofLens One Day" soft contact lens range have to be changed every day. The product assortment includes higher quality lenses, such as the "SofLens Comfort" or "Seequence" lenses which can be changed after two weeks. The "SofLens66 Toric" were specially designed for people with astigmatism. Lenses from the "Boston" range have a higher oxygen permeability and are more suited for people with sensitive or dry eyes. The newest and most advanced lens range is called "PureVision". These lenses are so oxygen-permeable that they can remain in the eye up to 30 days without being taken out at night. The second largest business, at 25%, is the manufacture of lens-care products. As well as simple combination cleaning and disinfectant solutions for both soft and hard lenses, pH neutral solutions are available for people with particularly sensitive eyes.

The Pharmaceuticals division manufactures pharmaceutical eye products, which account for 21% of turnover. This range covers prescription medicines for eye irritation, allergic reactions or high eye pressure. The development of this division was speeded up by take-overs of other firms.

The Surgicals division is divided into Refractive Surgery with 8% of turnover and Cataract Vitreotinal Surgery with 18%. The latter division is concerned with products for operations on glaucoma and cataracts and on the cornea, as well as implantable, interocular lenses. The Refractive Surgery division comprises mainly medical analysis devices and lasers required for eye surgery. In order to strengthen this division, the competing companies of Storz and Chiron were acquired.

PureVision
Bausch + Lomb was in a lawsuit with Novartis which claimed to have patents on a Bausch + Lomb product called PureVision. On June 26, 2002, a federal judge ruled that Bausch & Lomb did infringe on Ciba Vision (a subsidiary of Alcon) patents.

On July 2, 2004, the company announced that it had licensed the intellectual property of Novartis. Bausch & Lomb will pay the Ciba Vision unit of Novartis a royalty on net U.S. sales of its PureVision brand contact lenses until 2014 and on net sales outside the U.S. until 2016. But as of now, the brand FreshLook comes under Bausch and Lomb and Ciba manufacturers it.

ReNu product recalls

On April 11, 2006, Bausch & Lomb stopped shipments of its ReNu with MoistureLoc contact lens solution when the Centers for Disease Control and Prevention (CDC) announced there was a high correlation between use of the product and cases of suspected fungal keratitis. The Centers for Disease Control found that "nearly all of the company's ReNu with MoistureLoc eye care products were linked to severe fungal eye infections". Two class action lawsuits have been filed against Bausch & Lomb in relation to the eye fungus problems.

Diversity
Bausch & Lomb received a 100% rating on the Corporate Equality Index released by the Human Rights Campaign starting in 2003, the second year of the report.

Lawsuits 
In 1994, several states in the US, including Texas, opened an investigation against Bausch & Lomb. This investigation was based on the sale of duplicate contact lenses under different names and prices. Three different versions of the same contact lens were being sold under OptimaFW, Medalist lenses, and SeeQuence2. OptimaFW, the most expensive version, was available with a lifetime of one year, The mid-priced, Medalist lenses were sold with a lifetime of three months, and SeeQuence2, the least expensive, came with a lifetime of two to three weeks. By 1996, the company ensured that all three versions carried the OptimaFW tag and tried to standardize the packaging, but the pricing was still different. In 1996, the case was settled for $68 million. In 1997, 17 states pressured Bausch & Lomb to stop the sale of duplicate lenses, deceptive practice stated in the court. The settlement also demanded the company to pay $1.7 million or $100,000 to each state to cover investigative costs.

In 2009, Bausch & Lomb spent $250 million to settle six hundred lawsuits filed by consumers exposed to Fusarium keratitis, a fungal infection, after using its contact solution ReNu with MoistureLoc. Between June 2005 and September 2006, one hundred eighty cases were reported, out of which seven patients required eye removal and sixty required corneal transplants.

See also
 Biotech and pharmaceutical companies in New Jersey

References

External links

 Bausch & Lomb company website
 The Story of Bausch & Lomb

Optics manufacturing companies
Contact lenses
Eyewear brands of the United States
Instrument-making corporations
Manufacturing companies based in Rochester, New York
Organizations awarded an Academy Honorary Award
Manufacturing companies established in 1853
1853 establishments in New York (state)
History of Rochester, New York
Pharmaceutical companies based in New Jersey
Eyewear companies of the United States
Medical technology companies of the United States
2013 mergers and acquisitions
Academy Award for Technical Achievement winners
2022 initial public offerings
Companies listed on the Toronto Stock Exchange
Companies listed on the New York Stock Exchange
Companies based in Vaughan